Gewerblicher Rechtsschutz und Urheberrecht Rechtsprechungs-Report (GRUR-RR) is a monthly intellectual property law journal published in German. It comprises case law decisions "supplementing the court rulings section" of the main Gewerblicher Rechtsschutz und Urheberrecht (GRUR) journal. The first issue was published in 2001.

See also 
 List of intellectual property law journals
 GRUR International

References

External links 
  Web page on Verlag C.H. Beck web site
 
 

German-language magazines
Monthly magazines published in Germany
Intellectual property law journals
Law journals
Magazines established in 2001
Magazines published in Munich